Volfartice is a municipality and village in Česká Lípa District in the Liberec Region of the Czech Republic. It has about 700 inhabitants.

Administrative parts
The village of Nová Ves is an administrative part of Volfartice.

References

Villages in Česká Lípa District